The Río Sis is a river in southwest Guatemala. Its sources are in the Sierra Madre range, on the slopes of the Santo Tomás and Zunil volcanoes in the department of Suchitepéquez. It flows southwards through the municipalities of San Francisco Zapotitlán, Cuyotenango, San Lorenzo and Mazatenango and joins the Icán River, which flows into the Pacific Ocean.

References

Rivers of Guatemala